Olivier Hendriks (born 28 July 2003) is a Dutch Paralympic athlete. He won the silver medal in the men's 400 metres T62 event at the 2020 Summer Paralympics held in Tokyo, Japan. He is a silver medalist at the World Para Athletics Championships and a three-time medalist, including two golds, at the World Para Athletics European Championships.

References

External links 
 

Living people
2003 births
Sportspeople from Delft
Dutch male sprinters
Athletes (track and field) at the 2020 Summer Paralympics
Medalists at the 2020 Summer Paralympics
Paralympic athletes of the Netherlands
Paralympic silver medalists for the Netherlands
Medalists at the World Para Athletics Championships
Medalists at the World Para Athletics European Championships
21st-century Dutch people